Hyperolius pictus is a species of frog in the family Hyperoliidae.
It is found in Malawi, Tanzania, and Zambia.
Its natural habitats are subtropical or tropical high-altitude grassland, rivers, swamps, freshwater marshes, intermittent freshwater marshes, arable land, pastureland, rural gardens, and ponds.

References

pictus
Amphibians described in 1931
Taxonomy articles created by Polbot